The Packard Custom Super Eight One-Eighty was introduced for the 1940 model year (18th series) by the Packard Motor Car Company to replace the discontinued Packard Twelve as their top-of-the-line luxury model. The car was derived from the Packard Super Eight One-Sixty with which it shared the complete running gear including the in-line eight-cylinder,  engine that developed 160 horsepower. It was advertised as the most powerful eight-cylinder engine offered by any automobile manufacturer in 1940. (By contrast, the Cadillac Series 70 346 cubic inch V-8  developed 150 hp). It was complemented and gradually replaced by the more modern looking and mid-level Packard Clipper in 1941 and integrated into the Super Eight after the war.

Packards of all series (110, 120, 160, 180) shared similar body styling in 1940 (which some later said led to a "cheapening" of the once-exclusive luxury marque), using the same bodies with hoods and front fenders of different length to meet their respective chassis. Thus the 160 and 180 got identical bodies. However, the 180s featured finer interior detailing with the best fabrics, leather, and carpeting available. Packard used a special woolen ceiling in these cars only which was sewn longitudinally. Packard built the partition in its Limousines in a way that there was no hint of it when the partition glass was lowered, allowing the owner to use the car by himself as a sedan (thus the designation "Sedan Limousine" by Packard).

In 1940, Packard made air conditioning an option. It was developed by the Henney Motor Company, with whom Packard had a long-standing business connection. Air conditioning had been used on Henney-bodied ambulances as early as 1938. It was the first time that air conditioning was available on a stock automobile. The Packard 180 was also the first car to have power windows.

In an exclusive agreement with Packard from 1937 until Henney's demise in 1954, Henney provided bodies for Packards's ambulances, hearses and flower cars, and they often provided special custom bodywork for passenger cars. The pre-World War II Henney models usually had 160-180 trim but were actually constructed on the Packard 120A 156" wheelbase chassis with the smaller 288 cubic inch engine although there were also 160 and 180 versions available.

Packard offered exclusive coachwork beginning in 1937 with the LeBaron Cabriolet body series L-394 for US$4,850 ($ in  dollars ) and the LeBaron Town car body series L-395 for US$4,990 ($ in  dollars ). In 1938 through 1942 Rollston and Brunn & Company offered several custom coachwork options to the exclusive list.

There were minor styling changes in the 1941 and 1942 models (19th and 20th series), the most notable of which were the moving of the headlamps into the fenders. Also for the first time, running boards could be deleted with a rocker panel put in their place to cover the chassis, and two-tone paint schemes were available. New for 1941 was the Electromatic Drive, a vacuum-operated clutch system for the conventional 3-speed manual transmission. Packard's own automatic transmission, the Ultramatic, would not be ready until 1949.

The final 180s rolled off the Packard assembly line in February 1942, as production restrictions of World War II brought a halt to civilian automobile production. There have been allegations that dies for both Junior and Senior models were sold to the Soviet Union during World War II, and production continued until 1959 as the ZIS-110. James Ward found no supporting evidence in the Packard archives of such a transfer. Also, the ZIS-110 shares no sheet metal with any Packard, despite the fact that its external decor elements were intentionally designed to heavily resemble pre-war Packards, favoured by Stalin after he had received a '38 Super Eight convertible sedan as gift from Franklin D. Roosevelt.

Darrin-bodied cars 

Designer Howard "Dutch" Darrin had made a few special bodies on Packard-basis, beginning in 1937. He tried to sell Packard on the idea of Darrin-bodied cars being offered directly by Packard, and finally got his way after parking one if his creations outside the Packard dealers' annual conference. For the 1940 model year, three Darrin bodystyles were available: the closed four-door Sport Sedan, the four-door Convertible Sedan, and the two-door Convertible Victoria. About 100 Packard Darrins were built until 1942, when production of private cars ended because of the war. This was much fewer than planned.

Building even this number of cars would have overstretched Darrin's Hollywood workshops so they were built by American Central Manufacturing - one of the last remnants of the Auburn-Cord-Duesenberg conglomerate - in Connersville ("Little Detroit") Indiana instead. Darrin would travel back and forth between California and Indiana supervising construction. This work was shifted to Sayers & Scovill in Cincinnati (the company became Hess & Eisenhardt in 1942) to let ACM concentrate on building Jeep bodies. Between 59 and 72 Packard Darrins were built in 1940, of which 44 (or 48) were One-Eighties and the remainder One-Twenties. For the 1941 and 1942 model years the four-door Darrins were discontinued, leaving only the Convertible Victoria.

References

Ward, James A. The Fall of the Packard Motor Car Company, Copyright 1995, Page 46

External links

180
Cars introduced in 1940